"The Decapod" is the third episode of the second series of the 1960s cult British spy-fi television series The Avengers, starring Patrick Macnee and Julie Stevens. It was first broadcast by ABC on 13 October 1962. The episode was directed by Don Leaver and written by Eric Paice.

Plot
Steed is brought in to protect the President of the Republic of the Balkans from a masked assassin. He sends Venus on a phony tour, with real wrestlers.

Music
Julie Stevens sings "You're Getting To Be A Habit With Me" composed by Harry Warren and "I Got It Bad (and That Ain't Good)" by Duke Ellington, accompanied by the Dave Lee Trio.

Cast
 Patrick Macnee as John Steed
 Julie Stevens as Venus Smith
 Paul Stassino as Yakob Borb 
 Philip Madoc as Stepan
 Wolfe Morris as Ito 
 Lynn Furlong as Edna Ramsden
 Raymond Adamson as Harry Ramsden
 Harvey Ashby as Guard's Officer    
 Pamela Conway as Girl In Shower 
 Stanley M. Ayers as Ring Announcer   
 Doug Robinson as Bodyguard Georgi 
 Valentino Musetti as Bodyguard Sarkoff 
 Valerie Stanton as Cigarette Girl

References

External links

Episode overview on The Avengers Forever! website

The Avengers (season 2) episodes
1962 British television episodes